Robert "Bobby" Houston (born 1955) is an American filmmaker and actor. Houston first came to prominence with his performance of the character Bobby in Wes Craven's 1977 horror classic The Hills Have Eyes. He would reprise his role in the sequel The Hills Have Eyes Part II.

Aside from his work as an actor, Houston has also been a successful film director and screenwriter. Working with Lone Wolf & Cub Japanese action films, Houston wrote and directed an English-dubbed film called Shogun Assassin. Houston also wrote and directed several independent films in the 1980s, including the 1984 teen comedy Bad Manners.

In his later career, Houston became a successful documentarian, with his debut in 1998 with Rock The Boat. He would go on to direct Mighty Times: The Legacy of Rosa Parks in 2002 and Mighty Times: The Children's March in 2004. Both films were nominated for the Academy Award for Best Documentary (Short Subject), which the latter won. Houston is also the author of the novel Monday, Tuesday, Wednesday, which served as the basis for the 1986 film A Killing Affair.

Career

Acting

Documentaries

Personal life 
Houston's partner died of AIDS in 1995.

Awards

Filmography

Bibliography 
Monday, Tuesday, Wednesday (novel)

References

External links 

Living people
American male film actors
Male actors from California
Film directors from California
1955 births
American LGBT actors
LGBT film directors